The Australian Guild of Music (also known as the Australian Guild of Music Education) is an examination board, tertiary education provider and registered charity. It is based in Melbourne, Victoria and operates in Australia, Malaysia, Singapore and world wide through online education.

The Guild was founded in 1969 as the Australian Guild of Music and Speech, when its parent organisation, the London College of Music Examinations ceased operating in Australia.  It offers graded and diploma qualifications (up to postgraduate level) and a Bachelor of Music Degree accredited internationally by the  Tertiary Education Quality and Standards Agency, (TEQSA) and Vocational Certifications accredited by the Australian Skills Quality Authority.

References

External links

Schools in Australia, Music
Schools
Australia
Schools of the performing arts in Australia
Music venues in Melbourne
Australian vocational education and training providers
Educational institutions established in 1969
 
Music schools in Australia
Australian tertiary institutions
Education in Melbourne
1969 establishments in Australia